Daviesia major is a species of flowering plant in the family Fabaceae and is endemic to the south-west of Western Australia. It is an erect, many-stemmed shrub with scattered, erect, sharply-pointed, cylindrical phyllodes and orange and red flowers.

Description

Taxonomy and naming
This taxon was first formally described in 1864 by George Bentham in Flora Australiensis and given the name Daviesia hakeoides var. major, based on material collected by George Maxwell on "granite hille north from Cape Paisley". In 1995, Michael Crisp raised the variety to species status as Daviesia major. The specific epithet (major) means "larger or taller".

Distribution and habitat
This daviesia grows in heath with scattered eucalypts in sandy soil in near-coastal areas between Busselton and Israelite Bay in the Esperance Plains, Mallee and Swan Coastal Plain biogeographic regions of south-western Western Australia.

Conservation status
Daviesia major is listed as "not threatened" by the Government of Western Australia Department of Biodiversity, Conservation and Attractions.

References

major
Eudicots of Western Australia
Plants described in 1864
Taxa named by George Bentham